Lieutenant General Valery Anatolyevich Semerikov (Russian: Валерий Анатольевич Семериков; born in 28 June 1954), is a Russian politician and military commander who had served as the acting Secretary General of the Collective Security Treaty Organization in 2017 and again from 2018 to 2019.

Biography

Valery Semerikov was born in Borovitsa in Kirov Oblast on 28 June 1954.

In 1971, he entered the Kiev Higher Tank Engineering School, then served in the border troops.

In 1975, he served in the military in Transbaikalia on the border of the Soviet Union and China

In 1982, he was called to serve in Afghanistan. After returning from the war, he is appointed as deputy head of the Priargunsky border detachment.

In the late 1980s, he studied at the Military Academy of Armored Forces named after Marshal R. Ya. Malinovsky, after which he was sent to work at the Main Directorate of Border Troops with honors.

In 1994, he was appointed Deputy Commander of the North-Western Border District.

In 1995, he entered the Military Academy of the General Staff, from which he graduated with honors. Then he served in the central office of the Federal Border Service in the positions of chief of staff of armaments, in which he was the deputy director of the FPS.

In 2002, he was appointed First Deputy Director of the Border Service and was responsible for the arrangement of the state border in the Caucasus.

In 2003, he retired from the army to the reserve and worked in the CSTO Secretariat as Deputy Secretary General.

From January 1, 2017 to April 13, 2017 and November 1, 2018 to December 31, 2019, he served as Acting Secretary General of the CSTO.

Awards

He was awarded the Order of Friendship in 2007.

Family

He is married and has a son, who is an army officer.

References

1954 births
Living people